Thomas William Sword (born 12 November 1957) is a former professional football defender, who primarily played for Stockport County and has since been inducted into their Hall of Fame.

Biography 
Born in Newcastle-upon-Tyne, Sword started his professional footballing career with Stockport County after making a name for himself as a free-scoring striker in the Northern Football League with Bishop Auckland. He started in good form at County, scoring twice in a 2–1 win over Hartlepool United on his full debut, but was soon asked to play in defence when County were short due to injuries. Sword enjoyed a successful transition from striker to defender, playing out the remainder of his career at the back. Despite playing from defence, he maintained a good scoring record thanks mostly to converting 25 penalties. Sword was transferred to Hartlepool for £5,000 in July 1986, but soon returned to County for a brief stint to finish his footballing career.

He was awarded a testimonial against Manchester City soon after finishing playing professionally. In 2005, he was inducted into Stockport's Hall of Fame.

References

External links 
Past player profile at Stockportcounty.com

Living people
1957 births
English footballers
Footballers from Newcastle upon Tyne
English Football League players
Bishop Auckland F.C. players
Stockport County F.C. players
Hartlepool United F.C. players
Halifax Town A.F.C. players
Association football defenders